The 2nd World Orienteering Championships were held in Linköping, Sweden, 28–29 September 1968.

The championships had four events; individual contests for men and women, and relays for men and women.

The men's individual course had 18 controls over 14.6 kilometres, while the women's individual course had 10 controls over 7.8 kilometres.

Swedish Television (SVT) broadcast the entire individual competition live. This was the first time ever orienteering was shown live on TV in Sweden, or in any other country in the world.

Medalists

Results

Men's individual

Women's individual

References 

World Orienteering Championships
1968 in Swedish sport
International sports competitions hosted by Sweden
Sports competitions in Linköping
September 1968 sports events in Europe
Orienteering in Sweden